Yossi Gal is the Vice President for University Advancement and External Relations for the Hebrew University of Jerusalem (from which he graduated) and was the Israeli Ambassador to France and Monaco from 2010 until 2015.  He also served as Ambassador to the Netherlands from 1995 until 2001.

As Director General of Economic Affairs, he “fostered Israel’s accession to the OECD and strengthened ties between the country and the European Union. From 1991 to 1995, he also contributed to the bilateral peace negotiations between Palestinians and Jordanians as spokesman of the Israeli delegation.”

Awards and honors
in 2016, France named him as a Commander of the Legion of Honour.

References

Ambassadors of Israel to France
Ambassadors of Israel to Monaco
Ambassadors of Israel to the Netherlands
Hebrew University of Jerusalem alumni
Year of birth missing (living people)
Living people